Village of Daughters is a 1962 British comedy film directed by George Pollock and starring Eric Sykes, Scilla Gabel, John Le Mesurier, Grégoire Aslan, Graham Stark, and Warren Mitchell.

Plot
Herbert Harris is a poor traveling salesman who is forced off the bus at a remote Italian village because he has no more money for the fare. There, he finds many single and attractive women who all pursue him madly. Unbeknownst to him, the villagers have a dilemma. Antonio is a wealthy businessman in London who, in accordance with his father's wish, has decided to marry a woman from his ancestral village. He writes to the mayor and asks him to choose. The mayor wants to select his daughter Annunziata, but the other villagers object. The village priest recommends that they leave the matter in the hands of God and let the first visitor to the village be the one to make the decision. That turns out to be Herbert.

Cast

Reception
According to MGM records, the film made a loss of $268,000.

References

External links

1962 films
1962 comedy films
British comedy films
Films directed by George Pollock
Metro-Goldwyn-Mayer films
Films set in Sicily
Films scored by Ron Goodwin
Films shot at MGM-British Studios
1960s English-language films
1960s British films